Britt Ekland (born Britt-Marie Eklund; 6 October 1942) is a Swedish actress, model and singer. She appeared in numerous films in her heyday throughout the 1960s and 1970s, including roles in The Double Man (1967), The Night They Raided Minsky's (1968), Machine Gun McCain (1969), Stiletto (1969) and the British crime film Get Carter (1971), which established her as a sex symbol. She also starred in several horror films including the British horror film The Wicker Man (1973), and appeared as a Bond girl in The Man with the Golden Gun (1974).

Ekland continued to act throughout the remainder of the 1970s, having roles in films such as The Ultimate Thrill (1974), Royal Flash (1975), High Velocity (1976) and King Solomon's Treasure (1979), and into the 1980s starring in the likes of Fraternity Vacation (1985), Moon in Scorpio (1987) and Scandal (1989) although since the early 1990s her acting work has mainly consisted of stage shows, one-off roles, cameos or appearances on reality television.

Her high-profile social life, her 1964 marriage to actor Peter Sellers and her relationship with singer Rod Stewart attracted considerable press attention, leading to her being one of the most photographed celebrities in the world during the 1970s.

Early life
Ekland was born Britt-Marie Eklund in Stockholm, Sweden to Maj Britt, a secretary, and Sven Eklund, who ran an upmarket clothing store in Stockholm and was captain of the Swedish national curling team. Ekland's mother died of Alzheimer's disease in the 1980s, which had a profound effect on her.

Ekland grew up with three younger brothers, and has said that she was overweight for much of her childhood: "I was very heavy. God, I was brutal-looking. I always tried to be funny to make up for the fact that I was fat and ugly". As a teenager, Ekland left school to travel with a theatre company and was spotted in a coffee shop while in Italy by a talent agent who sent her to London to audition for films.

Film career

Ekland had small roles in the Swedish films Kort är sommaren (1962) and Det är hos mig han har varit (1963), before landing her first major supporting part in the George Marshall Western Advance to the Rear (1964).

In 1964 she appeared in the Christmas television film A Carol for Another Christmas with her then-husband, Peter Sellers. She followed this with After the Fox (1966), also starring Sellers; she made one more film with Sellers, The Bobo (1967). This was followed with a lead role as an Amish girl turned New York City burlesque dancer in William Friedkin's musical The Night They Raided Minsky's (1968), which earned Ekland critical acclaim. Next came Stiletto (1969), a crime drama, based on a novel by Harold Robbins, co-starring Alex Cord. She then starred in a string of Italian films, Machine Gun McCain (1969), The Conspirators (1969), and as Antigone in The Cannibals (1970).

In 1971 she was cast as a leading lady and gun moll in the iconic crime film Get Carter, opposite Michael Caine, which firmly established her as a blonde bombshell. The 1970s also saw Ekland in several horror films, including What the Peeper Saw (1972) as a disturbed bride; the Agatha Christie adaptation Endless Night (1972), playing the friend and companion of an American heiress; and as a hallucinatory figure in the anthology film Asylum (1972) opposite Charlotte Rampling. Her most iconic horror role came in the 1973 horror film The Wicker Man, in which she played a Pagan villager and seductress; however, her voice was dubbed in the film to disguise her Swedish-accented English.

Other roles included in the thriller The Ultimate Thrill (1974) and the British drama Baxter! (1973). On television, she was cast in the TV film The Six Million Dollar Man: Wine, Women and War (1973) opposite Lee Majors. Ekland's next prominent role came when she was cast as the lead Bond girl, Mary Goodnight, in the James Bond film The Man with the Golden Gun (1974), which received mixed reviews but furthered Ekland's status as a sex symbol. She played a comedy role in Royal Flash, which has been described as "perhaps her best screen work".

In 1976 Ekland provided the French spoken part at the end of then-boyfriend Rod Stewart's hit single "Tonight's the Night (Gonna Be Alright)". Ekland also portrayed biographical characters, such as the one based on real-life actress Anny Ondra (boxer Max Schmeling's wife) in the television film Ring of Passion (1978). Ekland was also featured in the horror films The Monster Club (1980) and Satan's Mistress (1982).

In 1978 she hosted a syndicated television series for American International Television called "Jukebox." Directed by Bruce Gowers and produced and written by Paul Flattery for Jon Roseman Productions, the series featured then-nascent music videos, most of which were originally produced by Roseman's companies in the United States and England.

Ekland had supporting roles in independent feature films. She appeared in the comedy film Fraternity Vacation (1985), followed by a role in the slasher film Moon in Scorpio (1988), and as prostitute Mariella Novotny in the feature Scandal (1989) about the Profumo affair.

She has guest-starred on various television series, including an appearance on the popular TV series Superboy, playing an alien disguised as Lara, Superboy's biological mother, during the show's second season in 1990. Ekland published a beauty and fitness book, Sensual Beauty: How to Achieve It (1984), followed by a fitness video in 1992. In the BBC television series I Love the '70s (1999), she hosted the 1971 episode in homage to her role as "Anna" in the film Get Carter.

Ekland's later career has mainly consisted of stage and television, with her last feature film role being in The Children (1990). She appeared on stage as a cast member in Cinderella at the Regent Theatre, Stoke-on-Trent in December 1999 and January 2000. She also appeared in Grumpy Old Women Live and participated in the Swedish reality show Stjärnorna på slottet (The stars at the castle) along with Peter Stormare, Arja Saijonmaa, Jan Malmsjö, and Magnus Härenstam. In December 2007 and January 2008 she starred again in Cinderella at the Wyvern Theatre, Swindon. She appeared as a guest on the British daytime television show Loose Women, in January 2008. 
From December 2008 to January 2009 Ekland starred in Cinderella at the Shaw Theatre in London. In a rare instance of her singing, she performed the song My Prince, originally recorded by Lara Pulver on the album Act One – Songs from the Musicals of Alexander S. Bermange. In 2009–10 she played the Fairy Godmother in Cinderella at Princess Theatre, Torquay. In December 2010 she starred as the 'Fairy Pea Pod' in Jack and the Beanstalk at the Kings Theatre, Southsea. She starred in further pantomimes at the Theatre Royal, Windsor, in 2011 and 2012.

In 2010 Ekland took part in the reality TV show I'm a Celebrity...Get Me Out of Here!, where she was the fourth celebrity to be voted off the show. Ekland was one of the housewives of Svenska Hollywoodfruar (English: Swedish Hollywood Wives) on TV3 from 2012 to 2014. In 2018 she participated in Let's Dance broadcast on TV4. She was the first to be eliminated on 30 March, placing 11th.

In 2020 Ekland appeared in Season 4 of BBC TV's The Real Marigold Hotel. Also in 2020, Ekland toured the country in a production of The Cat and the Canary playing Mrs. Pleasant. Although the production halted due to the COVID-19 pandemic, the production resumed touring in late 2021.

Personal life

Relationships and family
Ekland became famous overnight as a result of her 1964 whirlwind romance and marriage to English actor and comedian Peter Sellers, who proposed after seeing her photograph in the paper and then meeting her in London. She stood by him after he suffered a series of heart attacks shortly after their marriage. Ekland was stepmother to Sellers' children Sarah and Michael (who died of a heart attack at about the same age as his father). In January 1965 they had a daughter, Victoria. The couple made three films together, A Carol for Another Christmas (1964), After the Fox (1966), and The Bobo (1967), before divorcing in 1968.

On 17 December 1968, Mr Justice Orr granted Ekland a decree nisi for divorce in the High Court on the grounds of cruelty by Sellers. He did not contest the proceedings.

In June 1973, Ekland had a son, Nicolai Adler, with record producer Lou Adler.

She also had a much publicised romance with rock star Rod Stewart. They were introduced in 1975 by Joan Collins and lived together for more than two years, with Ekland giving up her career to focus on their relationship.

From 1979 to 1981, she dated and became engaged to singer Phil Lewis of the groups Girl and L.A. Guns.

In 1984, at age 42, she married Stray Cats drummer Slim Jim Phantom, who, at age 23, was 19 years younger. They had a son, Thomas Jefferson (born in 1988). They divorced in 1992.

Legacy

In 1980, her best-selling autobiography, True Britt, was published.

While Rod Stewart's domestic partner, Ekland inspired his hit song "Tonight's the Night (Gonna Be Alright)," which was 1977's overall #1 song. The song features a French spoken part from Ekland.

In 2004, Ekland was portrayed by Charlize Theron in The Life and Death of Peter Sellers. She accompanied Theron to the Cannes Film Festival, where she became highly emotional when she saw the film.

In the 2018 film My Dinner with Hervé, Ekland was played by Helena Mattsson.

Filmography

Film

Television

Reality television

Discography
 "Do it to Me once more (with feeling)" / "Private Party" (1979) No. 15 SWE

References

External links

 
 
 
 
 
 

1942 births
Living people
Actresses from Los Angeles
Actresses from Stockholm
Expatriate actresses in the United States
Family of Peter Sellers
Family of Rod Stewart
I'm a Celebrity...Get Me Out of Here! (British TV series) participants
Swedish autobiographers
Swedish expatriates in the United Kingdom
Swedish expatriates in the United States
Swedish women singers
Swedish film actresses
Swedish television actresses
Women autobiographers
20th-century Swedish actresses
21st-century Swedish actresses